The 1994 Afro-Asian Club Championship, was the 7th Afro-Asian Club Championship competition endorsed by the Confederation of African Football (CAF) and Asian Football Confederation (AFC), contested between the winners of the African Champions' Cup and the Asian Club Championship.

The final was contested in two-legged home-and-away format between Egyptian team Zamalek, the 1993 African Cup of Champions Clubs winner; and Korean team Pohang Steel, the 1993–94 Asian Club Championship winner. The first leg was hosted by Zamalek at the El Mahalla Stadium in El-Mahalla El-Kubra on 11 September 1994, while the second leg was hosted by Thai Farmers Bank at Kasikorn Bank Stadium in Bangkok on 21 September 1994.

Aggregate was 2–2, therefore Thai Farmers Bank won on away goals.

Teams

Match details

First leg

Second leg

References

1994
1994 in African football
1994 in Asian football
Zamalek SC matches
Thai Farmers Bank matches
September 1994 sports events in Africa
September 1994 sports events in Thailand
1994–95 in Egyptian football
1994 in Thai football
1994 sports events in Bangkok
International club association football competitions hosted by Egypt
International club association football competitions hosted by Thailand